The best-known German air campaign of the First World War was carried out against Britain. After several attacks by seaplanes, the main campaign began in January 1915 with airships. The raids were generally referred to in Britain as Zeppelin raids but  airships were also used. The Zeppelin Company was much better known and was responsible for producing the majority of the airships.

Weather and night flying made airship navigation and accurate bombing difficult. Bombs were often dropped miles off target (a raid on London hit Hull) and hitting military installations was a matter of luck. Civilian casualties made the Zeppelins an object of hatred. British defensive measures made airship raids much riskier and in 1917 they were largely replaced by aeroplanes. The military effect of the raids was small but they caused much alarm, some disruption to industrial production and the diversion of substantial resources from the Western Front. Concern about the conduct of the defence against the raids, the responsibility for which was divided between the Admiralty and the War Office, led to a parliamentary inquiry under Jan Smuts and the creation of the Royal Air Force (RAF) on 1 April 1918.

Airships made 51 bombing raids on Britain during the war in which 557 people were killed and 1,358 injured. The airships dropped 5,806 bombs, causing damage worth £1,527,585. Eighty-four airships took part, of which 30 were either shot down or lost in accidents. Aeroplanes carried out 52 raids, dropping 2,772 bombs of  weight for the loss of 62 aircraft, killing 857 people, injuring 2,058 injured and causing £1,434,526 of damage. The German bombing has been called, by some authors, the first Blitz, alluding to The Blitz of the Second World War. The defence organisation developed by the British foreshadowed the Ground-controlled interception system used in the Second World War.

1914

Early German long-range bombing

On 6 August 1914, the German Army Zeppelin Z VI bombed the Belgian city of Liège, killing nine civilians. Ten more died in a night attack on Antwerp on 25 August and 2 September. During the opening months of the war, a German pilot flying a  regularly dropped bombs on Paris. The first raid consisted of five small bombs and a note demanding the immediate surrender of Paris and the French nation. Before the stabilisation of the Western Front, German aircraft made a number of raids on Paris, slightly damaging Notre Dame Cathedral. The first bombing raids on England were nuisance raids carried out against Channel ports. German press reports mention a raid carried out on 27 October but there is no British record of an incident on this date.

First attack on Britain

The first certain raid on Britain occurred on 21 December; the weather was dull with a slight wind from the south and rain showers. Frankenberg und Proschlitz, dropped two bombs into the sea near the Admiralty Pier in Dover. On 24 December the weather was cloudy, slightly misty with a north-easterly breeze. Proudzynski and Fankenberg in FF.29 no. 204, appeared high over Dover; Tommy Terson looked up from his garden in Leyburne Road, picking Brussels sprouts for his Christmas dinner, as the object in the sky rushed past then his garden exploded and knocked him down, causing him superficial injuries. As he got up he saw a crater  where his sprouts had been. The windows of the houses near the explosion had been broken and a neighbour James Banks, up a ladder collecting holly, had been thrown to the ground. The aircraft dropped a bomb near Dover Castle, which broke some glass. A British pilot took off but failed to find the aircraft.

Christmas Day was fine with a light breeze from the south-south-west. A Vickers F.B.4 (Gunbus no. 664) of 7 Squadron Royal Flying Corps (RFC), flown by Second-Lieutenant Montagu Chidson and the gunner, Corporal Martin, overtook the raider near Erith and attacked over Purfleet. Both aircraft were engaged with 22 rounds by anti-aircraft guns and took evasive action. The Vickers machine gun carried by the F.B.4 jammed and Martin resorted to a carbine, loaded with nine rounds of incendiary ammunition, reserved for attacks on airships. Martin hit the FF.29 three times around the cockpits. The German pilot dived away; the British aircraft suffered an engine failure and glided down to land at Eastchurch. On the return journey the German pilot dropped two bombs harmlessly at Cliffe station and flew out to sea.

1915

German plans for a bombing campaign

Proposals to bomb Britain were first made by Paul Behncke, deputy chief of the German Naval Staff, in August 1914. These were backed by Alfred von Tirpitz, who wrote that "The measure of the success will lie not only in the injury which will be caused to the enemy but also in the significant effect it will have in diminishing the enemy's determination to prosecute the war". The campaign was approved by the Kaiser on 7 January 1915, who at first forbade attacks on London, fearing that his relatives in the British royal family might be injured. Following a failed attempt on 13 January 1915, which was abandoned because of the weather, the first successful attempt took place on the night of 19/20 January 1915. Two Zeppelins were to attack targets near the Humber estuary but were diverted by strong winds and dropped their bombs on Great Yarmouth, Sheringham, King's Lynn and the surrounding Norfolk villages. Two British aircraft took off but failed to find the airships; four people were killed and 16 injured. Monetary damage was estimated at £7,740 (£  in ).

The raid prompted alarmist stories about German agents using car headlights to guide Zeppelins to their targets. The first Navy attempts to bomb London, made by L8, failed due to poor weather. The first attempt was made on 26 February but was abortive due to headwinds. A second attempt ended when the airship flew below the cloud base to check its position and found itself over Belgian army positions near Ostend. The Zeppelin was riddled by small-arms fire and landed near Tienen, where it was destroyed by high winds. A four-airship raid by the Army on 17 March ran into fog and was abandoned, one airship bombing Calais and being damaged on landing. On 20 March the three remaining Army airships set off to bomb Paris and one was lost on the return journey. Two Navy raids failed due to bad weather on 14 and 15 April, and it was decided to delay further attempts until the more capable P-class Zeppelins were in service.

The Army received the first of these, LZ38 ( Erich Linnarz) raided Ipswich on 29/30 April and Southend on 9/10 May.  An Imperial Order dated 12 February authorised the bombing of the London docks, which was interpreted by the German General Staff as permitting bombing targets east of Charing Cross. This interpretation was formally accepted by the Kaiser on 5 May 1915. LZ38 also attacked Dover and Ramsgate on 16/17 May, where, over Dover at  it was illuminated by searchlights, the first such event in the war. Anti-aircraft fire induced Linnarz to dump his bombs on Oxney, to no effect; Flight Sub-Lieutenant Redford Mulock, a Canadian member of the Royal Naval Air Service (RNAS), flying an Avro from Westgate-on-Sea, carried two incendiary bombs and two hand-grenades.

Mulock caught up with LZ 38 as it bombed and Linnarz ordered the Zeppelin rapidly to climb before Mulock could attack then turned north, floating above the Goodwin Sands, where engine-trouble forced him to turn for home. LZ38 attacked Southend again on 26/27 May, dropping seventy bombs, killing three people and wounding three, with no damage to buildings. Five aircraft rose to intercept and failed to find the airship, two being damaged on landing. These four raids killed six people and injured six, causing property damage estimated at £16,898.

On the night of 30/31 May, Linnarz commanded LZ38 on the first London raid; LZ37 was also to be part of the raid but was damaged early on and returned to Namur. Flying from Evere LZ38 crossed the English coast near Margate at  before turning west over Southend. These devices, weighing , were filled with thermite and the exterior was wrapped in tarred rope. About 120 bombs were dropped on a line from Stoke Newington south to Stepney and then north toward Leytonstone. Seven people were killed and 35 injured; 41 fires were started, burning out seven properties and the total damage was assessed at £   Aware of the problems that the Germans were experiencing in navigation, the government issued a D notice prohibiting the press from reporting anything about attacks not mentioned in official statements. Earlier press reports had contained detailed information about where bombs had fallen. Fifteen sorties were flown against the raiders, only one of which managed to make visual contact with an airship. No ground-based guns fired and no searchlights found the airship; one British pilot was killed on landing.

The naval airships also tried to raid London; on 4 June strong winds led the commander of L10 to misjudge his position and bomb Gravesend. L9 was also blown off course by the weather on the night of 6/7 June, attacking Hull instead of London and causing considerable damage. On the same night a raid by three Army Zeppelins also failed because of the weather; as the airships returned to Evere they ran into RNAS aircraft flying from Veurne, Belgium. LZ38 was destroyed on the ground and LZ37 was intercepted in the air by Reginald Warneford in a Morane Parasol, who dropped six  Hales bombs on the Zeppelin, setting it on fire. LZ37 crashed into the convent school of Sint-Amandsberg; two nuns and all but one of the Zeppelin's crew died. Warneford was awarded the Victoria Cross for his achievement and Zeppelins were withdrawn from their bases in Belgium.

After an ineffective attack by L10 on Tyneside on 15/16 June the short summer nights discouraged further raids for some months and the remaining Army Zeppelins were reassigned to the Eastern and Balkan fronts. The Navy resumed raids on Britain in August.  On 9/10 August, four Zeppelins were directed against London; none reached its target and L12 was damaged by ground fire near Dover and came down in the sea off Zeebrugge. Despite eight attacks by RNAS aircraft, the airship was towed into Ostend where it was dismantled. The four-Zeppelin raid was repeated on 12/13 August; again only one airship, L10, made landfall, dropping its bombs on Harwich. A third four-Zeppelin raid tried to reach London on 17/18 August but two turned back with mechanical problems, one bombed Ashford, Kent in the belief it was Woolwich and L10 became the first Navy airship to reach London. L10 was beset by navigational errors, mistaking the reservoirs of the Lea Valley for the Thames and bombing Walthamstow and Leytonstone. Ten people were killed, 48 injured and property damage was estimated at £30,750. Anti-aircraft guns were fired at L10 and a few aircraft took off in pursuit but the Zeppelin suffered no damage. L10 was destroyed a little over two weeks later when it was struck by lightning, caught fire off Cuxhaven and was lost with all hands.

Two Army Zeppelins bombed London on 7/8 September, SL2 dropped bombs on the Isle of Dogs, Deptford, Greenwich and Woolwich, and LZ74 was forced to drop weight on its approach and scattered 39 bombs over Cheshunt, before heading on to London and dropping bombs on Bermondsey, Rotherhithe and New Cross. Eighteen people were killed and 28 injured; property damage totalled £9,616. Fog and mist prevented British aircraft taking off but anti-aircraft guns fired at LZ74 with no effect. Although these raids had no significant military impact, the psychological effect was considerable. The Navy attempted to follow up the Army's success the following night. Three Zeppelins were directed against London and L9 ( Loew) against the benzol plant at the Skinningrove ironworks. Another bomb hit a store of TNT but failed to explode. L9 crossed the coast on its homeward journey at Sandsend at  three RNAS pilots from Redcar had taken off but failed to make contact.

L11 had turned back early with engine trouble; L13 ( Heinrich Mathy) and L14 ( Böcker) flew across the North Sea together. Two trawlers were waiting off the Haisboro' light vessel and caught L14 at low altitude. One of the trawlers fired eight rounds from its QF 1-pounder pom-pom which led Böcker into a steep climb, under the impression that he had been engaged by light cruisers and turned north. Soon afterwards, L13 also encountered a trawler, which opened fire. L14 reached England at Cromer then suffered engine-trouble, apparently bombing Norwich but hitting Bylaugh, East Dereham and Scarning; four men were killed at East Dereham and seven people were injured for no material damage. L13 made landfall at the Wash and flew straight to London in clear skies, bombing Golders Green at  At Euston, L13 began to bomb again; the bomb-load included a  device, the largest yet carried; which exploded on Bartholomew Close near Smithfield Market, destroying several houses and killing two men.

More bombs fell on the textile warehouses north of St Paul's Cathedral, causing a fire which, despite the attendance of 22 fire engines, caused over half a million pounds damage. Mathy then turned east, dropping his remaining bombs on Liverpool Street station, fifteen HE and 55 incendiaries being dropped. Every shell exploded too low and the falling shell splinters caused alarm and damage on the ground. Three RNAS pilots took off from Yarmouth but had already landed by the time that L13 headed out to sea. Flight Sub-Lieutenant G. W. Hilliard landed at Bacton and was killed when the bombs on board exploded; Flight Lieutenant J. M. R. Cripps came down with engine-failure and jumped clear of his aircraft just before it touched down and suffered no injuries, the aeroplane being hardly damaged. The raid killed 22 people and injured 87; the monetary damage of £534,287 was over one sixth of the total damage inflicted by bombing raids during the war.

Theatreland Raid
After three more raids were scattered by the weather a five-Zeppelin raid which became known as the Theatreland Raid was launched by the Navy on 13 October. Arriving over the Norfolk coast around  the Zeppelins encountered nearer London the new London Air Defence Area defences installed since the September raid by Admiral Sir Percy Scott, which included new 3-inch guns at Barnes Common, King's Cross and Dollis Hill. The new gun sites proved ineffective, although the airship commanders commented on the improved defences of the city. A 13-pounder gun near Broxbourne was put out of action by three bombs dropped from L15, which continued to London and began bombing over Charing Cross, the first bombs striking the Lyceum Theatre and the corner of Exeter and Wellington Streets, killing 17 people and injuring 20. More bombs were dropped on Holborn, as the airship neared Moorgate it was engaged by a new French 75 mm anti-gun mounted on a lorry and manned by naval ratings from disbanded armoured car squadrons sited at the Honourable Artillery Company grounds in Finsbury.

L15 quickly jettisoned ballast, dropped only three more bombs (one landing on Aldgate High Street, causing much damage) before departing, having suffered engine damage from the shells. L13 bombed around Guildford and near Woolwich later on. L14 dropped bombs on Otterpool Army Camp near Folkestone, killing 14 soldiers, injuring 12 and later bombed Tonbridge and East Croydon. L16 and L11 had gone even further off course; L16 dropped up to 50 bombs on Hertford and L11 scattered a few bombs over Norfolk before heading home. In total, 71 people were killed and 128 were injured. This was the last raid of 1915, as bad weather coincided with the new moon in November and December 1915 and continued into January 1916.

In December 1915, more P-class Zeppelins and the first of the new Q-class airships were delivered. Better defensive measures of the British made raids more hazardous and several airships were destroyed. By mid-1916, there were 271 anti-aircraft guns and 258 searchlights in England. New types of Zeppelin with improved ceilings restored the German technical advantage but led to further flying and navigation problems; oxygen was needed to fly at high altitude, the extreme cold led to crew fatigue and more faults. German meteorologists did not appreciate the differing wind conditions likely to be met at high altitude. Defence against Zeppelins was haphazard and divided between the RNAS and the Royal Flying Corps (RFC), the Navy engaging enemy airships approaching the coast and the RFC responsible once the Zeppelins were over land. The War Office believed that the Zeppelins used a layer of inert gas to protect themselves from incendiary bullets and discouraged the use of such ammunition in favour of bombs. Trials of incendiary bullets in mid-1915 at Gosport and Upavon were unimpressive and the explosive Pomeroy bullet attracted little official interest. Experiments undertaken in 1916 by the RFC at the School of Musketry, Hythe using a mixture of explosive and incendiary rounds were promising and 500,000 Pomeroy bullets were ordered; a mixture of Pomeroy, Brock and Buckingham bullets brought the defending aircraft their first victories.

1916

The first raid of 1916 was carried out by the German Navy. Nine Zeppelins were sent to Liverpool on the night of 31 January/1 February. Poor weather, difficulty in navigating and mechanical problems scattered the aircraft across the Black Country, bombing Tipton, Wednesbury and Walsall; 61 people were reported killed and 101 injured. Fifteen of the fatalities occurred in the town of Tipton. L21 ( Max Dietrich), caused the majority of the damage. Despite the ground fog, 22 aircraft took off to find the Zeppelins but none succeeded. Six aircraft were damaged beyond repair and two pilots were killed in landing accidents.

L19 ( Odo Loewe) was last seen low off the West Frisian Islands and fired on with small-arms by Dutch troops. No airships could take off due to high winds, several aircraft from Borkum found nothing and two failed to return. At dusk on 1 February a Zeppelin, apparently in difficulties, was reported off Cromer. Harwich Force sent several light cruisers and destroyers but found nothing. Loewe appealed for rescue but the trawler skipper refused, despite offers of money, fearful of his crew of eight being overpowered by the Germans; a search was conducted but nothing was found.

Ten home defence squadrons were organised by February 1916, with the defence of London assigned to 19 Squadron at Sutton's Farm and Hainault Farm (renamed 39 (Home Defence) Squadron in April 1916, which was also allocated North Weald Bassett airfield in August 1916). The number of aircraft varied and in February there were only eight squadrons at less than half-strength; by June the number of squadrons had been cut to six and only 39 Squadron was at full strength and equipped with the B.E.2c aircraft, outclassed on the Western Front but providing a stable gun platform suitable for night fighting. Raids were postponed due to a spell of poor weather and by the withdrawal of the majority of Navy Zeppelins to resolve their chronic mechanical unreliability. Three Zeppelins set off to bomb Rosyth on 5/6 March but were forced by high winds to divert to Hull, killing 18 people, injuring 52 and causing £25,005 damage.

On 19 March, a Gotha UWD 120 and 4 Friedrichshafen FF.33 seaplanes took off from Zeebrugge at 12:00 p.m. and bombed Dover, hitting Langton Fort, Dover Castle, Shoulder of Mutton battery and "a large number of sheds and barracks" with thirty-two  bombs at 2:40 p.m. After finishing its bombing run, the UWD turned and made an S-course for Zeebrugge, being the first aircraft to reach Dover and return at 4:30 p.m. A Caudron G.4 and several Sopwith Baby aircraft tried to intercept the remaining FF.33s but failed.

On the night of 30 March/1 April seven Navy and three Army Zeppelins set off to bomb eastern England and London; most turned back with mechanical trouble or because of the weather. L15 was intercepted by Claude Ridley, who was unable to do more than fire a few rounds at extreme range; the Zeppelin was damaged by anti-aircraft fire over Purfleet before being attacked by Alfred Brandon using Ranken darts. It came down in the sea near Margate, all but one of the crew surviving. Most of the 48 people killed in the raid were victims of a bomb which fell on an Army billet in Cleethorpes. The following night two Navy Zeppelins, diverted from London by the weather, bombed targets in the north of England, killing 22 people and injuring 130.

On the night of 2/3 April, a six-airship raid was made by Army and Navy airships, the naval ships against the naval base at Rosyth and the Forth Bridge on the east coast of Scotland, the Army Zeppelins attacking London. None of the airships bombed their intended targets; 13 people were killed, 24 injured and much of the £77,113 damage was caused by the destruction of a warehouse in Leith full of whisky. A two-Zeppelin raid the following night failed to bomb London in inclement weather and caused no casualties or damage; another against the north of England on the night of 5/6 April had little effect. One of the three raiders turned back with mechanical problems; the ironworks at Skinningrove and a colliery near Bishop Auckland were bombed with casualties of one dead and nine injured.

On 28/29 July the first raid to include L31, one of the new R-class Zeppelins, took place. The ten Zeppelins achieved very little; four turned back early and the rest wandered over a fog-shrouded landscape before giving up. Adverse weather dispersed raids on 30/31 July and 2/3 August. On 8/9 August, two Zeppelins were part of a nine-airship raid on Hull. The sixth successful London raid was on 24/25 August, when 13 Navy Zeppelins set out and L31 reached London; flying above low clouds, 36 bombs were dropped in ten minutes on West Ferry Road, Deptford Dry Dock, the station at Norway Street and homes in Greenwich, Eltham and Plumstead. Nine people were killed, 40 injured and £130,203 of damage was caused. L31 suffered no damage in the attack but several weeks of repair work were needed following a hard landing.

On 2/3 September, twelve Navy airships and four from the Army attacked England. Rain and snowstorms scattered the airships while they were over the North Sea. None of the Navy airships reached London and only the Army ship LZ98 and the new SL11 achieved their objective. SL11 came in over Foulness to attack the capital from the north-west. It was lost in cloud over Wood Green but caught by the searchlights at Waltham Abbey as it bombed Ponders End. At around  one of the three aircraft in the sky that night came into range, a B.E.2c piloted by Lieutenant William Leefe Robinson, flying from Suttons Farm. Robinson fired a drum of ammunition from his Lewis gun on each of three passes. As Robinson emptied the third drum, the airship began to burn from the stern and was quickly enveloped by flames. SL11 fell to the ground near Cuffley, witnessed by the crews of four of the Navy Zeppelins; there were no survivors. For bringing down the first rigid airship on British soil and the first 'night fighter' victory, Leefe Robinson received the Victoria Cross. The pieces of SL11 were gathered up and sold by the Red Cross to raise money for wounded soldiers.

The loss of SL11 ended the Army interest in raids on Britain. The Navy persisted and a 12-Zeppelin raid was launched on 23/24 September. Eight older airships bombed targets in the Midlands and the North-east, while four M-class Zeppelins (L30, L31, L32 and L33) attacked London. L30 did not cross the coast, dropping its bombs at sea. L31 approaching London from the south, dropped a few bombs on Kenley and Mitcham and was then illuminated by searchlights. Forty-one bombs were dropped in rapid succession over Streatham, killing seven people and wounding 27. More bombs were dropped on Brixton before crossing the river and dropping 10 bombs on Leyton, killing another eight people and injuring 30; L31 turned for home. Also coming in from the south was L32, delayed by engine problems. It dropped a few bombs on Sevenoaks and Swanley before crossing Purfleet at about  The Zeppelin then came under anti-aircraft fire as it dropped bombs on Aveley and South Ockendon. At  a B.E.2c piloted by 2nd Lieutenant Frederick Sowrey engaged L32. He fired three drums of incendiary ammunition and started a fire which quickly spread. The Zeppelin narrowly missed Billericay High Street, coming down at Snail's Hall Farm off Green Farm Lane, Great Burstead at  All 22 men of the crew were killed, with some, including the commander  Werner Peterson, choosing to jump rather than burn to death. Witnesses said Paterson was still clutching the ship's log when he hit the ground; a photograph of the impression exists. The crew of L32 were buried at Great Burstead Church on 27 September 1916.

L33 dropped a few incendiaries over Upminster before losing its way and making several turns, heading over London and dropping bombs on Bromley around midnight. Dropping bombs now to shed weight, a large number fell on homes in Botolph Road and Bow Road. As the airship headed towards Chelmsford it continued to lose height, coming under fire at Kelvedon Hatch and briefly exchanging fire with a B.E.2c. The airship was set alight and the crew headed south before being arrested by police at Peldon. Inspection of the wreckage provided the British with much information about the construction of Zeppelins, which was used in the design of the British R33-class airships. One  engine recovered from the wreck was substituted for two (of four)  engines on a Vickers-built machine, the hitherto underpowered R9.

The next raid came on 1 October 1916. Eleven Zeppelins were launched at targets in the Midlands and at London. Only L31 ( on his 15th raid, reaching London) overcame the weather. Approaching from Suffolk, L31 was picked up by the searchlights at Kelvedon Hatch around  turning away, the airship detoured over Harlow, Stevenage and Hatfield. As the airship neared Cheshunt at about  it was quickly picked up by six searchlights. Three aircraft of 39 Squadron were in the air and closed in. A B.E.2c piloted by 2nd Lieutenant Wulstan Tempest engaged the Zeppelin at around  three bursts were sufficient to set fire to L31 and it crashed near Potters Bar with all 19 crew killed, Mathy jumping to his death. Tempest had dived out of the way of the stricken airship and crashed on landing, though without injury, possibly suffering from anoxia.

A raid on 27/28 November by L13, L14, L16, L21, L22, L24, L30, L34 ( Max Dietrich), L35 and L36 avoided London and the south of England, attacking targets in the Midlands and Tyneside. Halfway across the North Sea, L30 turned back with engine-trouble. The other airships crossed the sea in two groups, the first of five airships arriving between Scarborough and the Humber estuary and the other four heading for the Tyne. The bombing was largely ineffective, killed four people, injured 37 and caused £12,482 damage. L34 was shot down in flames off the coast at Hartlepool by 2nd Lieutenant Ian Pyott of 36 Squadron flying a B.E.2c. L21 was shot down by three aircraft near Yarmouth; Flt Sub-Lieutenant Edward Pulling was credited with the victory and awarded a DSO, the other pilots receiving the DFC. The following day a LVG CIV made the first German aeroplane raid on London; hoping to hit the Admiralty, six  bombs were dropped between Victoria station and the Brompton Road.

There were no further raids in 1916 but the Navy lost three more airships on 28 December. SL12 came back damaged, made a bad landing and was destroyed overnight at Ahlhorn by strong winds. At Tønder ground crews handling L24 suffered an equipment failure and the ship crashed into a shed, bursting into flames and setting off L17, both being destroyed. German losses during 1916 led to attempts to make airships less vulnerable by increasing their ceiling.

1917

When more Gothas were supplied  17 and 18 moved to Mariakerke to the north-west of Ghent. Ghistelles continued as the main diversion airfield and the four bases were levelled to reduce damage to the Gotha undercarriages.

The first raid of 1917 took place on the night of 16/17 March. Five high-flying Zeppelins encountered very strong winds and none reached their targets. On the return flight, L39 (army name LZ86 Type R), commanded by  Koch, suffered an engine failure, was blown over French-held territory and brought down in flames near Compiègne by ground fire. The crew was killed and this was a serious blow to the army air effort because they had accumulated twenty months' experience in L24, SL3 and LZ86. On 23/24 May six Zeppelins set out to bomb London but were frustrated by high winds and thick cloud. A few bombs were dropped on Suffolk, killing one person and causing £599 damage. German bombing over England on the nights of 13 June, carried out by Gotha Bombers and airships, among which was the L45, was met with anger by the British population. The raid caused 527 casualties, including 104 deaths, a number of which were children. The striking of a children's school in the raid and the death of a number of students prompted a plaque to be laid with a poem,

Operation Turk's Cross

 3 received the first Gotha G.IV aircraft in March and after a period of working up, the squadron had 18 Gothas in three flights. Over Belgium the sky was mostly clear and no more than a quarter clouded. Over south-eastern England, the air was clear, with patches of mist and cloud, Essex being noticeably overcast. South of the Thames, the cloud was broken and the air was clear over south-east Kent.  3 dispatched 12 Gothas to bomb London but two Gothas were forced to turn back over the North Sea due to mechanical difficulties. Ten bombers were sighted by the crew of the Tongue lightship at  making landfall at about  Cloud over London caused the Gothas to divert to secondary targets at the Channel port of Folkestone and the nearby Shorncliffe Army Camp.

At Shorncliff and Cheriton, 17 Canadian soldiers were killed and 93 wounded. At Folkestone a soldier and fifteen men, 31 women and 25 children were killed, eight soldiers, 23 men, 48 women and twelve children were wounded, most of the casualties occurring in Tontine Street, which was full of shoppers; 95 people were killed and 195 injured. As the formation flew out to sea under anti-aircraft gun fire, they were pursued by 33 RFC and 37 RNAS aircraft. Nine RFC aircraft took off from Detling, Bekesbourne and Throwley before  and saw the Gothas but their B.E.12s could not climb above . A ferry pilot taking an aircraft from Lympne to France reached  and attacked a Gotha at point-blank range but his gun failed to fire; by the time he cleared the stoppage the Gothas were out of range. Leslie was engaged by another Gotha and went into a spin, losing contact with the formation. Nine RNAS Sopwith Pups from Dunkirk engaged the bombers near the Belgian coast. A captured German airman later said that a Gotha had been shot down off the Belgian coast, one crashed in Belgium and one landed damaged at St Denis Westrem.

As there had been little planning, early attempts to intercept the Gothas were ineffective. In England, 92 aircraft took to the air but few were able to climb high enough to engage the bombers. A Bristol F.2 Fighter of 35 (Training) Squadron flown by Captain John Cole-Hamilton with Captain C. H. C. Keevil as the observer, attacked three Gothas over Ilford but Keevil was hit by return-fire and killed instantly. British anti-aircraft guns near the coast managed to hit the aircraft of Captain T. Grant of 39 Squadron, who made a forced-landing at Rochford. As the Gothas flew on the crews could see aircraft taking off from airfields as they approached, the air peppered with smoke from anti-aircraft fire. Near Ostend, a British formation was spotted and one fighter made a head-on attack on a Gotha which was then attacked by a Sopwith Camel from the rear, hitting the aircraft with gunfire before the combined fire of several Gothas drove off the British fighters.

The raid caused 162 deaths and 432 injuries. Among the dead were 18 children, killed by a bomb falling on the Upper North Street School primary school in Poplar. The reason for the relatively large numbers of casualties seems to have been public ignorance as to the threat posed by aerial bombardment in daylight. Lieutenant Charles Chabot, a RFC pilot on leave, recorded that: "...Raids hadn't become a very serious thing and everybody crowded out into the street to watch. They didn't take cover or dodge". This was the deadliest air raid of the war and no Gothas were lost. On taking off for the return journey, his aircraft had an engine failure; Brandenburg was severely injured and his pilot,  Freiherr von Trotha, was killed.

On the night of 16/17 June, an attempted raid by six Zeppelins met with some success; two airships were unable to leave their shed due to high winds and two more turned back with engine problems. Of the two that reached England, L42 hit a naval ammunition store in Ramsgate, while L48, the first U-class Zeppelin, was intercepted near Harwich and attacked by a DH.2 flown by Captain Robert Saundby, a F.E. 2b flown by Lt F. D. Holder and Sgt S. Ashby, and a B.E.12 flown by Pierce Watkins. The Zeppelin came down in flames near Theberton in Suffolk; Watkins was credited with the victory.

A further Gotha raid of 22 aircraft was made on 7 July, resulting in 57 deaths and 193 injuries on the ground. One hundred sorties were flown against the formation, resulting in one Gotha shot down and three damaged for two fighters shot down. Felixstowe and Harwich were bombed on 22 July and Southend and Shoeburyness on 12 August, with the loss of one Gotha, four others crashing on landing. On 18 August, the largest raid of the war was attempted, despite a warning of unfavourable weather. Twenty-eight aircraft took off and soon encountered the predicted high winds; after nearly two hours in the air they had made so little progress that Zeebrugge was still in sight. With barely enough fuel left to return to Belgium, the flight commander called off the attack. The high wind caused two aircraft to come down in the North Sea and others ran out of fuel and were lost making forced landings, two coming down in neutral Holland. On 22 August, 15 aircraft set out to attack Margate and Dover. Five turned back over the North Sea and the rest were met by heavy anti-aircraft fire and fighter aircraft over the Isle of Thanet. Two Gothas were shot down almost immediately and a third was shot down over Dover.

Night bombing

The improved British air defences forced  3 to  turn to night bombing, at first intended to be temporary until re-equipped with improved aircraft but the Gotha G V turned out to be a disappointment, no better than the G IV. Night raids provided a measure of protection from interceptors and anti-aircraft fire but they greatly complicated navigation and landing. Many damaged aircraft limped back to their airfields only to be lost in landing accidents.

The first night attack was an experimental raid by five Gothas on 3/4 September against Chatham. At  made landfall at Westgate in Kent heading south-east. As the aircraft flew over the Isle of Thanet they dropped two  bombs which fell on a farm. Five more bombs fell in fields and gardens at St Peter's, damaging several windowpanes. A  bomb fell near the RNAS barracks in the town and two hit the drill hall, being used for accommodation for several hundred men. The explosions killed 130 sailors and wounded another 88, the tower clock stopping at  Another  bomb fell next to the barracks causing minor damage and two  bombs fell onto open ground in the docks, then three more  bombs fell, one explodong on the roof of a school causing much damage. The second  bomb broke some window panes and the third fell near the Sally Port, wounding five people, one mortally. more bombs were dropped to little effect on Gillingham and several window panes in Luton. A woman was killed and two wounded by a  bomb but all the other bombs dropped sufficed only to injure a boy and damage some property. South of Chatham two more  bombs were dropped to no effect. None of the local anti-aircraft guns engaged the bombers which were invisible in the dark. The bombing of the RNAS barracks caused the worst death toll of the war.

Encouraged by the lack of night defences, a raid on London was carried out the following night. Of the eleven aircraft which set out, nine reached England and five got as far as London; 18 British defensive sorties were flown but none made contact. The defensive flights were significant in that the aircraft used included Sopwith Camels, proving that it was practical to fly the type at night. One Gotha failed to return, probably shot down by anti-aircraft fire from Fort Borstal near Rochester. Six raids followed at the end of September. On 24 September 16 Gothas set off and 13 reached England, most bombing Dover and other targets in Kent, with only five reaching London. This coincided with an unsuccessful Zeppelin attack on the Midlands. The following night 15 Gothas set out, with similar results, only three aircraft reaching London. One of the bombers came down in the North Sea, probably the victim of a Sopwith 1½ Strutter flown by Douglas Bell and George Williams of 78 Squadron. On 28 September 25 Gothas and two  took off but most turned back due to adverse weather. Three people were wounded and £129 damage was caused, for the cost of three Gothas lost and six damaged on landing.

The following night seven Gothas and three  took off, killing 40 people and injuring 87 for the loss of one aircraft. By this time the population of London was thoroughly alarmed, with up to 300,000 people seeking shelter in Underground stations and others leaving London to sleep in whatever accommodation was available, some in fields. On 30 September 11 Gothas set off to raid London and on 1 October 18 took off, eleven reaching England. Over 14,000 rounds were fired by British anti-aircraft guns without scoring a hit. By now shells were in short supply and many of the guns had fired so many rounds that their barrels were worn out. The Government reallocated new  guns from arming merchant ships against submarines, to the defence of London. The barrage was also proving hazardous to those on the ground, in that week eight people had been killed and another 67 injured by falling fragments.

'Silent' Zeppelin raid on London

The last attack by Zeppelins on London took place on the night of 19 October 1917. It had been over 12 months since the last Zeppelin raid, during which time the ceiling of German airships had been improved to a height that existing aeroplanes could not reach. Their undersides had also been coated with a special non-reflective black paint, rendering them almost invisible to searchlights. Up to eleven Zeppelins including LZ85, approached London from the north, with a few bombs falling north of Watford being reported from around 9:00 p.m. The wind was freshening from the north-west. The commander of the Western sub-section of the London Air Defence Area, Lt-Col. Alfred Rawlinson (holder of Royal Aero Club Aviator's Licence No. 3 and brother of Sir Henry Rawlinson), surmised that the airships were likely to switch off their engines; carried silently on the wind over central London, they would drop their bombs undetected. 

Rawlinson ordered all the searchlights in the London area to be switched off, since they would 'give the game away'. A bomb was dropped at around 11:30 p.m. on the heart of the West End, destroying the premises of Swan & Edgar in  Piccadilly Circus but the ground defences remained silent. Another bomb fell on Grove Park, Lewisham a few minutes later but the deception worked; London avoided up to 200 bombs. None of the Zeppelins made it back to their base in Jutland.

Further Gotha raids

The RNAS and RFC carried out bombing raids on German bomber airfields at St Denis-Westrem and Gontrode, forcing the squadrons to relocate to Mariakerke and Oostakker, with the staff headquarters moving to Ghent. The next raid against England was carried out on 29 October, when three aircraft set out, two diverting to Calais because of the weather and the third dropping its bombs on the Essex coast. The following night a big raid was mounted, the bomb load including large numbers of a new  incendiary bomb. Twenty-two Gothas took off, of which over half released their bombs on Kent, with little effect other than the destruction of a gasometer in Ramsgate. Bombs were dropped on the eastern suburbs of London but many of the incendiaries failed to ignite and five aircraft crashed when attempting to land.

Poor weather prevented raids in November and the Gotha crews occupied themselves with training flights. To lessen the chance of a raid meeting adverse weather, in December the Germans began to send out a radio-equipped Rumpler C.IV to make weather observations off the English coast. The weather cleared on 5 December, when 19 Gothas and two  attacked in waves. Casualties were light but over £100,000 of damage was caused, mostly in London. Two Gothas were brought down by anti-aircraft fire and one with an engine disabled, attempted a landing at Rochford aerodrome, struck a tree on approach and crashed. The second aircraft came down near Canterbury and in both cases all the crew survived but a third aircraft and crew was reported missing.

1918
The  (England Squadron) had an inauspicious new year when, on 17 January, two crews were killed while testing their aircraft. On 25 January, a raid was cancelled because of fog but on 28 January, during the full moon period, 13 Gothas and two  (Giants) took off into a clear sky but a thick mist began to spread. Six of the Gothas turned back before reaching England and the rest made landfall at about  Over a hundred British night-fighter sorties were flown, resulting in one Gotha being shot down after being subjected to a co-ordinated attack by two Camels from 40 Squadron RFC, flown by Second Lieutenants Charles (Sandy) Banks and George Hackwill, the first victory for night-fighters against a heavier-than-air bomber over Britain; both pilots were awarded the DFC.

The bombing killed 67 people  and injured 166; the casualties included 14 dead and 14 injured in stampedes when people queuing for admission to shelters were alarmed by maroons, set off to warn of a raid but mistaken for exploding bombs; another 11 people were injured by shell splinters from exploded anti-aircraft shells. Many of the other casualties were caused by a  bomb, which fell on the Odhams printing works in Long Acre, which was being used as a shelter. After the losses at the end of 1917, the loss of one Gotha and damage to four more in landing accidents led to the suspension of operations against England, pending the reorganisation of the squadron and replacement of aircraft and crews.

The following night, the first raid undertaken by Giants unaccompanied by Gothas, took place. Four aircraft from Rfa 501 took off from Gontrode and St denis-Westrem, each with a  bomb load. R12 turned back with engine trouble over the Channel and turned back, dumping its bombs on British positions near Gravelines. R25, R26 and R39 crossed the English coast to the north of the Thames Estuary. Misled by the sound of the Giants's engines observers warned that a minimum of fifteen aircraft were aloft and eighty fighters were scrambled. R26 had trouble in two of its engines was forced to turn back by anti-aircraft fire at Billericay and bombed Rawreth, Thundersley and Rayleigh and at sea at the Blackwater and Margate. Three houses were damaged and a farm building at Rawreth were damaged.

The Giant turned west and bombed Isleworth, Kew and Brentford, causing damage to several houses, killing ten people and wounding ten. As the Giant flew for home it was attacked over Gravesend and the attacker fired 100 rounds before breaking off the attack after losing his night vision when a tracer bullet hit a propeller blade. Another Giant was spotted on its approach above North Benfleet in Essex; four pilots attacked the Giant whose crew dumped its bombs near Wanstead for no result. The British pilots continued to attack as the Giant turned for home but despite attacks until the Giant reached the coast at Eastchurch, the aircraft flew on.

Rfa 501 attacked again on the night of 16/17 February, four aircraft reached England, one carrying a  bomb which, aimed at Victoria station, fell half a mile away on the Royal Hospital, Chelsea. An aircraft attacked the following night, hit St Pancras station; 21 people were killed and 32 injured. Another Giant raid took place on 7 March; five aircraft reached England, one carrying a  bomb, which fell on Warrington Crescent near Paddington station: among the dead was Lena Ford, who had written the lyrics of the popular wartime song Keep the Home Fires Burning.

On 12 March, five Zeppelins attempted a raid on the Midlands but headwinds caused them to mistake their position and two dropped their bombs in the sea, the rest bombing the Hull area with little effect, their commanders thinking that they were over Leeds. Another raid was attempted the following night but only one of the three airships reached England, bombing Hartlepool. The bombs killed eight people and an RFC pilot was killed when he flew into Pontop Pike near Dipton, County Durham. A third airship raid took place on 12 April, the altitude at which the airships flew and weather caused navigational problems; although attacks were claimed on towns in the Midlands, most of the bombs fell in open country. Seven people were killed, 20 injured and £11,673 damage was caused.

By the middle of March, the Gotha squadron was once again ready to attack England but had to support the German spring offensive which started on 21 March, being used to bomb Calais, Dunkirk, Boulogne and troop concentrations and railways. On 9 May, Rfa 501 suffered a calamity when four aircraft attempted to bomb Dover. High winds caused them to be recalled when over the Channel, by which time fog had covered their base. One aircraft landed safely, the crew of a second survived a crash in which the aircraft was written off and the remaining two crashed with the loss of all but one member of each crew.

The last and largest aeroplane raid of the war took place on the night of 19 May 1918, when 38 Gothas and 3 Giants took off against London. Six Gothas were shot down by night-fighters and anti-aircraft fire; a seventh aircraft was forced to land after being intercepted by a Bristol fighter of 141 Squadron from Biggin Hill, crewed by Lieutenant Edward Turner and Lieutenant Henry Barwise which fought a long engagement with the Gotha. This was the first victory of the war for Biggin Hill, for which Turner and Barwise were awarded the Distinguished Flying Cross.

After this raid,  3 and Rfa 501 principally flew in support of the army. The development of the  B-1E  incendiary bomb, led to a project,  (The Fire Plan), which involved the use of the whole German heavy bomber fleet, flying in waves over London and Paris and dropping all the incendiaries that they could carry, until they were either shot down or the crews were too exhausted to fly. The hope was that the two capitals would be destroyed in an inextinguishable blaze, causing the Allies to sue for peace. Thousands of  bombs were delivered to bomber bases and the operation was scheduled for August and again in early September 1918 but on both occasions, the order to take off was countermanded at the last moment, perhaps because of the fear of Allied reprisals.

The last Zeppelin raid on Britain took place on 5 August 1918, when four Zeppelins bombed targets in the Midlands and the North of England. Despite thick cloud, two aircraft intercepted the new L70, which was carrying Peter Strasser,  of the German Imperial Navy, as an observer. The Zeppelin was shot down in flames with no survivors. Egbert Cadbury and Robert Leckie flying a DH.4 were credited with the victory. The remaining airships dropped their bombs blind, relying on radio bearings for navigational information and none fell on land. An attempt was made to salvage the wreckage of L 70 and most of the structure was brought ashore, providing the British a great deal of technical information. The bodies of the crew were buried at sea.

Notes

Citations

Bibliography 

Books
 
 
 
 
 
 
 
 
 
 
 
 
 
 
 
 
 
 
 
 
 
 
 
 

Websites

Further reading
 
 
 
 

 
 
 
 
 
 
 
 
 
 
 
 
 
 
 
 

Journals

External links
 Historical footage of Zeppelins in World War I, europeanfilmgateway.eu
 The Brock Bullet Claim Flight Aircraft Engineer Magazine

World War I
Aviation in World War I
World War I strategic bombing
Aerial operations and battles of World War I
Battles and military actions in London